Bulgarian Rise (BV) is a national conservative political party in Bulgaria. It was founded on 5 May 2022 by Stefan Yanev, the former caretaker Prime Minister and Defence Minister.

Political positions
Some describe the party as both pro-Putin and pro-Russia. Future party leader Yanev was removed from the Petkov Government in March 2022 after he refused to describe the Russian invasion of Ukraine as a war. He launched the party two months later. Despite this, the party backed sending military aid to Ukraine, with the condition that Bulgaria receive modern NATO weaponry in exchange.

There is little consensus over the party's stances on economic matters. They have been labelled as centre-left, though Yanev himself has said the party is not on the right nor the left.

The party has garnered some criticism for not expressing substantive positions on most political issues.

Structure 
The party has one leader, Stefan Yanev. To take part in the 2022 parliamentary snap elections, it allied with four smaller "mandate carrier" parties, Svoboda, Party of the Greens, the Alternative for Bulgarian Revival , the Agrarian People's Union and Union of Free Democrats.

2022 Composition 

In February 2023, Yanev announced that the party would contest the upcoming elections individually, although members of their previous electoral coalition could participate as part of the 'civic quota' or as list members.

Electoral history

National Assembly

Notes

References

Conservative parties
Conservative parties in Bulgaria
Eurosceptic parties in Bulgaria
Nationalist parties in Bulgaria
Political parties established in 2022